Edward Romanowski (30 July 1944 – 11 November 2007) was a Polish sprinter who specialized in the 200 metres.

He was born in Warsaw and represented the club Legia Warszawa. At the 1967 European Indoor Games he won a silver medal in the 4 x 300 metres relay, which he ran together with Tadeusz Jaworski, Jan Balachowski and Edmund Borowski. At the 1968 Olympic Games he reached heat two of the 200 metres. In the 4 x 100 metres relay he finished eighth in the final together with Wiesław Maniak, Zenon Nowosz and Marian Dudziak. At the 1969 European Indoor Games he won a gold medal in the relay, where Poland was the only competing team. The teammates were Andrzej Badeński, Henryk Szordykowski and Jan Radomski.

He became Polish 200 metres champion in 1968.

He was buried at the Służew Old Cemetery in Warsaw.

References

1944 births
2007 deaths
Polish male sprinters
Athletes from Warsaw
Athletes (track and field) at the 1968 Summer Olympics
Olympic athletes of Poland
Burials at Służew Old Cemetery
20th-century Polish people